Now: The Hits of Spring 2011 was released on 9 September 2011. It is the 34th album in the series of the Australian Now! series

"Rolling in the Deep" by Adele was previously featured in Now: The Hits of Autumn 2011.

Track listing
Adele – "Rolling in the Deep" (3:47)
Bruno Mars – "Marry You" (3:49)
Katy Perry – "Last Friday Night (T.G.I.F.)" (3:51)
Eskimo Joe – "Love Is a Drug" (3:41)
Coldplay – "Every Teardrop Is a Waterfall" (4:01)
Avalanche City – "Love Love Love" (3:13)
Jason Derulo – "Don't Wanna Go Home" (3:26)
Christina Perri – "Jar of Hearts" (3:33)
Lady Antebellum – "Just a Kiss" (3:36)
James Blunt – "I'll Be Your Man" (3:36)
Good Charlotte – "1979" (2:59)
Simple Plan featuring Natasha Bedingfield – "Jet Lag" (3:21)
Snoop Dogg featuring T-Pain – "Boom" (3:50)
Lupe Fiasco featuring Trey Songz – "Out of My Head" (3:24)
Tinie Tempah featuring Wiz Khalifa – "Till I'm Gone" (3:42)
Wiz Khalifa – "Roll Up" (3:47)
Zoë Badwi – "Carry Me Home" (Grant Smillie Edit) (2:37)
Kylie Minogue – "Put Your Hands Up (If You Feel Love)" (3:35)
Cody Simpson – "On My Mind" (3:10)
The Wombats – "Techno Fan" (3:56)
Birds of Tokyo – "The Gap" (3:46)
Panic! at the Disco – "Ready to Go (Get Me Out of My Mind)" (3:33)

External links
 NOW – The Hits of Spring 2011 @ Discogs

2011 compilation albums
Now That's What I Call Music! albums (Australian series)
EMI Records compilation albums